A Christian child's prayer is Christian prayer recited primarily by children that is typically short, rhyming, or has a memorable tune. It is usually said before bedtime, to give thanks for a meal, or as a nursery rhyme. Many of these prayers are either quotes from the Bible, or set traditional texts. 

While termed "Christian child's prayer", the examples here are almost exclusively used and promoted by Protestants. Catholic and Orthodox Christians have their own set of children's prayers, often invoking Mary, Mother of Jesus, angels, or the saints, and including a remembrance of the dead. Some adult prayers are equally popular with children, such as the Golden Rule (Matthew 7:12), the Doxology, the Serenity Prayer, John 3:16, and for older children, The Lord's Prayer and Psalm 23.

For the history of Christian songs for children, see Boys' choir § Middle ages & early development, nativity play, and  Sunday school § Development.

Bedtime prayer

Now I Lay Me Down to Sleep

Original version
Now I lay me down to sleep,
I pray the Lord my soul to keep;
If I should die before I wake,
I pray the Lord my soul to take. Amen.

More recent variants:
Now I lay me down to sleep,
I pray the Lord my soul to keep;
Guide me, Jesus, through the night
and wake me with the morning light.
Amen.

Now I lay me down to sleep,
I pray the Lord my soul to keep;
Keep me safe through the night
and wake me with the morning light
If I should die before I wake,
I pray the Lord my soul to take. Amen.

Now I lay me down to sleep,
I pray the Lord my soul to keep;
Angels watch me through the night
and wake me with the morning light.
Amen.

Now I lay me down to sleep,
I pray the Lord my soul to keep;
If I should die before I wake,
I pray the Lord my soul to take.
If I should live another day
I pray the Lord to guide my way.

Now I lay me down to sleep,
I pray the Lord my soul to keep;
If I should die before I wake,
I pray the Lord my soul to take.
There are four corners on my bed,
There are four angels overhead,
Matthew, Mark, Luke and John,
God bless this bed that I lay on.

Matthew, Mark, Luke and John

Luther's Evening Prayer 

I thank Thee, my Heavenly Father, through Jesus Christ, Thy dear Son, that Thou hast graciously kept me this day, and I pray Thee to forgive me all my sins, where I have done wrong, and graciously keep me this night. For into Thy hands I commend myself, my body and soul, and all things. Let Thy holy angel be with me, that the Wicked Foe may have no power over me. Amen.

The New England Primer 
Evening Prayer from the 1777 New England Primer:
O Lord God who knowest all Things, thou seest me by Night as well as by Day. I pray thee for Christ's Sake, forgive me whatsoever I have done amiss this Day, and keep me all this Night, while I am asleep. I desire to lie down under thy Care, and to abide forever under thy Blessing, for thou art a God of all Power and everlasting Mercy. Amen

Lullabies 
Now I lay you down to sleep
And pray the Lord your soul to keep 
May angels guide you through the night and wake you in the mornings light
My sweet so tiny and sweet 
You’ve had your day 
You’ve had your play
But now it’s time to say good night
My sweet so tiny and sweet

Now the Day is Over 

1. Now the day is over,
Night is drawing nigh;
Shadows of the evening
Steal across the sky.

2. Now the darkness gathers,
Stars begin to peep,
Birds and beasts and flowers
Soon will be asleep.

3. Jesus, give the weary
Calm and sweet repose;
With Thy tend'rest blessing
May mine eyelids close.

There are five additional verses.

Sleep my Child and Peace Attend Thee

Lullabies in German

Der Mond ist aufgegangen

Weißt du, wie viel Sternlein stehen

Brahms' Lullaby

Lullabies in Latin

The Virgin's Cradle Hymn

Lullabies in Scots

Baloo Baleerie

Lullabies in Welsh

Suo Gân

Lullabies in Armenian

Koon yeghir, pahlahs, atchkert khoop ahra

Lullabies in Swedish

Vaggsång till Jesus

Morning Prayer

Luther's Morning Prayer 

I thank Thee, my Heavenly Father, through Jesus Christ, Thy dear Son, that Thou hast kept me this night from all harm and danger; and I pray Thee to keep me this day also from sin and all evil, that all my doings and life may please Thee. For into Thy hands I commend myself, my body and soul, and all things. Let Thy holy angel be with me, that the Wicked Foe may have no power over me. Amen.

White Paternoster

The New England Primer 
Morning Prayer from the 1777 New England Primer:
Almighty God the Maker of every thing in Heaven and Earth; the Darkness goes away, and the Day light comes at thy Command. Thou art good and doest good continually. I thank thee that thou has taken such Care of me this Night, and that I am alive and well this Morning. Save me, O God, from Evil, all this Day long, and let me love and serve thee forever, for the Sake of Jesus Christ thy Son. Amen.

Morning Songs

Morning Has Broken

Morning Songs in Swedish

Din klara sol går åter opp

Giving thanks

God Is Great
 With these additional lines, it is sung to "Twinkle Twinkle Little Star":

God is great and God is good. 
And we thank him for our food.

By his hands we all are fed. 
Thank you, Lord, for our daily bread. 
God is great and God is good, 
And we thank him for our food. Amen.

Thank You Lord 

Thank you my God for the day you have given us!
Thank you because you are great and worthy.
Thank you for another day of living,
Thank you for each breath we have taken
Thank you for dying on that cross my God
For our sins!
Forgive our sins, Lord 
Amen.

Come Lord Jesus 

Come Lord Jesus,  be our guest, 
let this food to us be blessed, Amen.

A Slovak Lutheran tradition adds a second verse:
And may there be a goodly share
on every table everywhere.

A variant often used in the Lutheran Church–Missouri Synod is

Come Lord Jesus,  be our guest, 
And let Thy gifts to us be blessed, Amen.

The Lord is Good to Me

All Good Gifts 
The chorus to We Plough the Fields and Scatter may be used as a table grace:

All good gifts around us
Are sent from heaven above,
Then thank the Lord, O thank the Lord
For all His love.

For this Food 
For this food and joy renewed, we praise your name, O Lord!

Organized prayer

Regent's prayer 
Almighty God, 
we acknowledge our dependence upon Thee, 
and we beg Thy blessings upon us, our parents, 
our teachers and our country.

Philmont grace 

For food, for raiment, 
for life, for opportunity, 
for friendship and fellowship, 
we thank you, O Lord.

S Bar F grace 
For the gifts of food and freedom, 
And the hills to roam. 
For the crimson sunsets 
And the Earth, our home 
For the stars at night 
And the gentle winds in the trees 
We thank you, Great Spirit, for all of these.

Spirituals

He's got the Whole World in his hands 

He's got the whole world in his hands. 
He's got you and me, brother in his hands. 
He's got you and me, sister in his hands. 
He's got the little bitty baby in his hands. 
He's got the whole world in his hands.

Michael Row The Boat Ashore 

Michael, row the boat ashore, Alleluia! 
Michael, row the boat ashore, Alleluia!

Sister help to trim the sails, Alleluia! 
Sister help to trim the sails, Alleluia!

The river is deep and the river is wide, Alleluia! 
Milk and honey on the other side, Alleluia!

Jordan's river is chilly and cold, Alleluia! 
Chills the body, but not the soul, Alleluia!

If you get there before I do. Alleluia! 
Tell my people I'm coming too. Alleluia!

Kumbaya

Nobody Knows the Trouble I've Seen

Go Down Moses

We Are Climbing Jacob's Ladder

Children, Go Where I Send Thee

Every Time I Feel the Spirit

I Shall Not Be Moved

I'm So Glad, Jesus Lifted Me

Dem Bones

Ezekiel Saw the Wheel

Lord, I Want to Be a Christian

When the Saints Go Marching In

We Shall Overcome

Carols

The Twelve Days of Christmas

Away in a Manger

He is Born, the Child Divine

Light One Candle for Hope

A la Nanita Nana

Thy Little Ones, Dear Lord are We (Norwegian)

Oh, Come, Little Children

Other songs

Jesus Loves Me 

Jesus loves me - this I know, 
For the Bible tells me so, 
Little ones to Him belong, 
They are weak but He is strong.

Yes, Jesus loves me. 
Yes, Jesus loves me. 
Yes, Jesus loves me. 
The Bible tells me so.

Jesus loves me, He who died,
Heaven's gate to open wide.
He will wash away my sin;
Let His little child come in.

Jesus loves me, loves me still,
Though I'm very weak and ill.
From His shining throne on high,
Comes to watch me where I lie.

Jesus loves me! He will stay
Close beside me all the way
Then His little child will take
Up to heaven for His dear sake.
 1860 poem by Anna Bartlett Warner, set to music in 1862 with added chorus by William Batchelder Bradbury. This is the original version; rewritten versions are common.

Jesus Loves the Little Children 
Jesus loves the little children, 
All the children of the world. 
Red and yellow, black and white, 
They are precious in His sight, 
Jesus loves the little children of the world. 
 Words written by preacher Clarence Herbert Woolston (1856–1927)
 Sung to the 1864 Civil War tune "Tramp! Tramp! Tramp!" by George Fredrick Root
 Inspired by Matthew 19:14: Jesus said, "Let the little children come to Me, and do not hinder them, for the kingdom of heaven belongs to such as these."
 Some versions change Woolston's original words slightly by inserting the color "brown" between "red" and "yellow."
 Some modern versions read 'Ev'ry colour, ev'ry race, all are cover'd by His grace' instead of 'Red and yellow, black, and white, all are precious in His sight.'
 Alternate lyrics:
Jesus loves the little children,
All the children of the world. 
Fat and skinny, short and tall, 
Jesus loves them one and all,

OR

Jesus died for all the children, 
All the children of the world. 
Red and yellow, black and white, 
All are precious in His sight, 
Jesus died for all the children of the world.

Praise Him, Praise Him 
Praise Him, praise Him, all ye little children,
God is love, God is love;
Praise Him, praise Him, all ye little children,
God is love, God is love.

Three verses following this replace "praise" with "love," "thank," and "serve."

All Things Bright and Beautiful 
The chorus of All Things Bright and Beautiful has been recommended for children ages five and younger.

All things bright and beautiful,
All creatures great and small,
All things wise and wonderful,
The Lord God made them all.

Give Me Oil in My Lamp

Joyful, Joyful, We Adore Thee

Zacchaeus Was a Wee Little Man

This Little Light of Mine

I've Got the Joy Joy Joy Joy

I Am Jesus' Little Lamb 

Children of the Heavenly Father 

(original in Swedish, Tryggare kan ingen vara)

Jesus, remember me / When you come into Your kingdom

In My Life Lord, Be Glorified

Lord of All Hopefulness

My Tribute (To God Be The Glory)

Seek Ye First

Jesus Bids Us Shine

Vi sätter oss i ringen (Swedish)

Historical songbooks 
Divine Songs Attempted in Easy Language for the Use of Children by Isaac Watts, 1715
Hymns for the Amusement of Children by Christopher Smart, 1771
Hymns in Prose for Children by Anna Laetitia Barbauld, 1781
 Hymns for Little Children by Cecil Frances Alexander, 1848

Print Sources 
Bobb, Barry All God's People Sing. St. Louis: Concordia Publishing House, 1992, 316 pp.
English Evangelical Lutheran Synod of Missouri and other States. Sunday-School Hymnal. Pittsburgh: American Lutheran Publication Board, 1901, 464 pp.
O'Neal, Debbie Trafton Thank you for This Food: Action Prayers, Songs, and Blessings for Mealtime. Minneapolis: Augsburg Fortress, 1994, 32 pp.
Johnson, David A. My First Hymnal. St. Louis: Concordia Publishing House, 2011, 128 pp.
Kirkpatrick, William J. Joy and praise: a Sunday-school song book Cincinnati, Ohio: Fillmore Music House, 1908, 266 pp.
Wesleyan Methodist Church The Methodist Sunday-school hymn-book, compiled by direction of the Wesleyan-methodist conference London: Wesleyan-Methodist Sunday-School Union, 1879, 488 pp.

References 

Nursery rhymes
Christian prayer
Religious works for children
Christianity and children]